Yulin is a town under the administration of Saihan District, Hohhot, Inner Mongolia, China. , it has one residential community and 21 villages under its administration.

References 

Township-level divisions of Inner Mongolia
Hohhot